Ágoston Bényei (born 3 April 2003) is a Hungarian football player who plays for Diósgyőr.

Career statistics

References

External links
 
 

2003 births
Living people
Sportspeople from Debrecen
Hungarian footballers
Hungary youth international footballers
Hungary under-21 international footballers
Association football midfielders
Debreceni VSC players
Diósgyőri VTK players
Nemzeti Bajnokság I players
Nemzeti Bajnokság II players